Max Gerson (October 18, 1881 – March 8, 1959) was a German-born American physician who developed the Gerson Therapy, a dietary-based alternative cancer treatment that he claimed could cure cancer and most chronic, degenerative diseases.

Gerson described his approach in the book A Cancer Therapy: Results of 50 Cases (1958). The National Cancer Institute evaluated Gerson's claims and concluded that his data showed no benefit from his treatment. The therapy is both ineffective and dangerous.

Early life and career
Gerson was born to a Jewish family in Wongrowitz, German Empire (Wągrowiec, now in Poland), on October 18, 1881. In 1909, he graduated from the Albert Ludwig University of Freiburg. He began practicing medicine at age 28 in Breslau (Wrocław, now in Poland), later specializing in internal medicine and nerve diseases in Bielefeld. By 1927, he was specializing in the treatment of tuberculosis, developing the Gerson-Sauerbruch-Hermannsdorfer diet, claiming it was a major advance in the treatment of tuberculosis. Initially, he used his therapy as a supposed treatment for migraine headaches and tuberculosis. In 1928, he began to use it as a claimed treatment for cancer. When the Nazis came to power in 1933 Gerson left Germany, emigrating to Vienna, where he worked in the West End Sanatorium. Gerson spent two years in Vienna, before moving to France in 1935, associating with a clinic near Paris before moving to London in 1936. Shortly thereafter, he moved to the United States, settling in New York City.

In the United States
Gerson emigrated to the United States in 1936, passed his medical board examination, and became a U.S. citizen in 1942. The rest of his family died at the hands of the Nazis. In the U.S., Gerson applied his dietary therapy to several cancer patients, claiming good results, but other workers found his methodology and claims unconvincing. Proponents of the Gerson Therapy believe a conspiracy headed by the medical establishment prevented Gerson from publishing proof that his therapy worked. In 1958, Gerson published a book in which he claimed to have cured 50 terminal cancer patients: A Cancer Therapy: Results of 50 Cases. In 1953, Gerson's malpractice insurance was discontinued and, in 1958, his medical license in New York was suspended for two years.

Death
Gerson died March 8, 1959, of pneumonia. A conspiracy theory has subsequently spread that Gerson was murdered following a lifetime of supposed persecution.

Gerson therapy
Initially, Gerson used his therapy as a treatment for migraine headaches and tuberculosis. In 1928, he began to use it as a supposed treatment for cancer.

Gerson Therapy is based on the belief that disease is caused by the accumulation of unspecified toxins, and attempts to treat the disease by having patients consume a predominantly vegetarian diet including hourly glasses of organic juice and various dietary supplements. Animal proteins are excluded from the diet under the unproven premise that tumors develop as a result of pancreatic enzyme deficiency. In addition, patients receive enemas of coffee, castor oil and sometimes hydrogen peroxide or ozone.

After Gerson's death, his daughter Charlotte Gerson (March 25, 1922 - February 10, 2019) continued to promote the therapy, founding the "Gerson Institute" in 1977. The original protocol also included raw calf's liver taken orally, but this practice was discontinued in the 1980s after ten patients were hospitalized (five of them comatose) from January 1979 to March 1981 in San Diego, California, area hospitals due to infection with the rare bacterium Campylobacter fetus. This infection was seen only in those following Gerson-type therapy with raw liver (no other cases of patients having sepsis with this microbe, a pathogen in cattle, had been reported to Centers for Disease Control and Prevention in the previous two years). Nine of ten hospitalized patients had been treated in Tijuana, Mexico; the tenth followed Gerson therapy at home. One of these patients who had metastatic melanoma died within a week of his septic episode. Many of the patients had low sodium levels, thought to be associated with the very low sodium Gerson diet. The photographer Garry Winogrand died of gallbladder cancer in a Gerson Clinic in Tijuana.

Evidence
Gerson's therapy has not been independently tested or subjected to randomized controlled trials, and thus is illegal to market in the United States. The Gerson Institute promotes the therapy by citing patient testimonials and other anecdotal evidence. Gerson published a book discussing the alleged success of the therapy in 50 patients, but a review by the U.S. National Cancer Institute was unable to find any evidence that Gerson's claims were accurate. The NCI found that no in vivo animal studies had been conducted. Similarly, case series by Gerson Institute staff published in the alternative medical literature suffered from methodological flaws, and no independent entity has been able to reproduce the claims.

Attempts to independently check the results of the therapy have been negative. A group of 13 patients sickened by elements of the Gerson Therapy were evaluated in hospitals in San Diego in the early 1980s; all 13 were found to still have active cancer. An investigation by Quackwatch found that the institute's claims of cure were based not on actual documentation of survival, but on "a combination of the doctor's estimate that the departing patient has a 'reasonable chance of surviving', plus feelings that the Institute staff have about the status of people who call in".

A 1994 article in the Journal of Naturopathic Medicine attempted to follow 39 Gerson patients in Tijuana. Patient interviews were used to confirm the existence and stage of cancer; most patients were unaware of the stage of their tumor, and medical records were not available. Most patients were lost to follow-up; of the patients successfully followed, 10 died and six were alive at their last follow-up. Review of this study pointed out its "obvious flaws", including "the majority of patients lost to follow-up, lack of access to detailed medical records, and reliance upon patients for disease stage information"; the authors themselves regarded the results as unclear.

The American Cancer Society reported that "[t]here is no reliable scientific evidence that Gerson therapy is effective in treating cancer, and the principles behind it are not widely accepted by the medical community. It is not approved for use in the United States." In 1947, the National Cancer Institute reviewed 10 claimed cures submitted by Gerson; however, all of the patients were receiving standard anticancer treatment simultaneously, making it impossible to determine what effect, if any, was due to Gerson's therapy. A review of the Gerson Therapy by Memorial Sloan-Kettering Cancer Center concluded: "If proponents of such therapies wish them to be evaluated scientifically and considered valid adjuvant treatments, they must provide extensive records (more than simple survival rates) and conduct controlled, prospective studies as evidence". In 1959, the National Cancer Institute (NCI) again reviewed cases of patients treated by Gerson. The NCI found that the available information did not prove the regimen had benefit. Cancer Research UK states that "Available scientific evidence does not support any claims that Gerson therapy can treat cancer [...] Gerson therapy can be very harmful to your health."

Safety concerns
Gerson therapy can lead to several significant health problems. Serious illness and death have occurred as a direct result of some portions of the treatment, including severe electrolyte imbalances.

Continued use of enemas may weaken the colon's normal function, causing or worsening constipation and colitis. Other complications have included dehydration, serious infections and severe bleeding. 

The therapy is not recommended for pregnant or breast-feeding women and certain cancers and illnesses.

Coffee enemas have contributed to the deaths of at least three people in the United States. Coffee enemas "can cause colitis (inflammation of the bowel), fluid and electrolyte imbalances, and in some cases septicemia". The recommended diet may not be nutritionally adequate. The diet has been blamed for the deaths of patients who substituted it for standard medical care.

Relying on the therapy alone while avoiding or delaying conventional medical care for cancer has serious health consequences. Jessica Ainscough, better known as "The Wellness Warrior", was a major proponent of the Gerson diet after her diagnosis with cancer. She rejected medical treatment and followed the diet strictly, documenting her progress in a popular blog. She died from her untreated cancer in February 2015, aged 29.

See also
Chelation therapy
List of diets
List of unproven and disproven cancer treatments
Belle Gibson

References

External links
 
Questionable Cancer Therapies, from Quackwatch (includes section on Gerson Therapy with references)

1881 births
1959 deaths
People from Wągrowiec
People from the Province of Posen
University of Breslau alumni
University of Würzburg alumni
University of Freiburg alumni
Jewish emigrants from Nazi Germany to the United States
Physicians from New York (state)
Alternative cancer treatments
Raw foodists
Pseudoscientific diet advocates
Deaths from pneumonia in New York City